Ariyoshi (written: 有吉) is a Japanese surname. Notable people with the surname include:

, Japanese politician
, American politician
, Japanese comedian
, American labor unionist and activist
, Japanese manga artist
, Japanese shogi player
, Japanese footballer
, Japanese writer

Japanese-language surnames